Priyal Gor is an Indian television and film actress. She is known for starring in the romantic fantasy drama Ichhapyaari Naagin as Iccha.

Personal life 
Priyal Gor was born and brought up in Mumbai in a Gujarati family. She has a younger brother and an elder sister.

Career
Gor's mother wanted her to become an actress. She started her acting career in 2010, when she got the lead female role in Ram Milaye Jodi. In the same year, through a friend she got a role in Disney Channel's Ishaan: Sapno Ko Awaaz De. Within 15 days of shooting for it she landed the lead female role of Mona in the Zee TV show Ram Milaye Jodi. At the age of seventeen Priyal got the role of Monia/Manyata in Dekha Ek Khwaab. She also had supporting roles in Baat Hamari Pakki Hai and Ammaji Ki Galli. Later she appeared in single episodes in Gumrah: End of Innocence, Yeh Hai Aashiqui MTV Webbed and Savdhaan India as well as a cameo in Like OK's Ek Boond Ishq. She has also participated in the Pakistani show Madventures. Besides she has appeared in various television and print advertisements, stating that they helped her gain more popularity.

In 2013, she made her feature film debut with the Punjabi romantic comedy Just U & Me in which she played an NRI named Geet. She is set to debut in Telugu in 2014 with Sasi Kiran Narayana's Saheba Subramanyam, which is the Telugu remake of the Malayalam film, Thattathin Marayathu. She played the female lead in the 2015 Malayalam film Anarkali opposite Prithviraj Sukumaran. She had also signed a Malayalam film God Bless You by Benjith Baby Mylaady. In 2018, she played the lead role of a lesbian in a web-series called Maaya 2. In June 2018, she joined the cast of Zee TV's soap opera Aap Ke Aa Jane Se as Chameli. In 2020, she appeared as Parvathy in Colors TV's show Naati Pinky Ki Lambi Love Story. In 2021, she portrayed Mamta in Sony Sab's show Tera Yaar Hoon Main.

Filmography

Films

Television

Web series

References

External links

 

Living people
Indian television actresses
Indian soap opera actresses
Indian film actresses
People from Gujarat
Actresses in Malayalam cinema
Actresses in Telugu cinema
Actresses in Punjabi cinema
1994 births